Maxton Gig Beesley Jr. (born 16 April 1971) is an English actor and musician. He has appeared in a variety of television shows such as Bodies, The History of Tom Jones, a Foundling, Survivors, Mad Dogs, Homeland, Suits, The Last Enemy, Ordinary Lies, Jamestown, The Outsider, Operation Fortune, and most recently Kingdom.

Early life
Beesley was born on 16 April 1971 in Burnage, Manchester. His father, Maxton Beesley Sr, is a professional jazz drummer and actor, and his mother was a jazz singer who performed under the stage name Chris Marlowe. He has a step-brother, Jason Milligan, who is also an actor. He has a brother Gary who is a teacher.  His parents divorced when he was a baby. His middle name was inspired by the American actor Gig Young. His father was also a regular guest on the Ted Rogers show 3-2-1, doing impressions amidst several sketches.

Career

Acting
Beesley studied in New York under teacher Sheila Gray. He is an advocate for method acting and approaches all his roles with this technique. Beesley came to prominence with his first major acting role in BBC's The History of Tom Jones, a Foundling, a 1997 television mini-series based on the book of the same name. He then appeared in the film Kill Me Later alongside Selma Blair. He also starred in Mike Figgis' movie Hotel.  He starred in the BBC Three medical drama Bodies, which ran from 2004 to 2006 and won best drama at the Royal Television Society awards. He also starred in the BBC One series Hotel Babylon from 2006 to 2008, with a guest appearance thereafter in one episode.

In June 2007, Beesley starred in the ITV series Talk to Me. He also starred in the film Red Roses and Petrol alongside Malcolm McDowell, and in the BBC thriller The Last Enemy with Benedict Cumberbatch and Robert Carlyle. In October 2008, he was one of the lead characters in BBC One's remake of the 1970s drama Survivors, as remorseless former criminal Tom Price. The series consisted of six episodes, with a second series of six episodes transmitted in January 2010. He starred in the ITV drama The Reckoning in April 2011. Beesley gained more exposure with American audiences with a recurring role on Suits in 2013 and from October 2015 with another recurring role, this time in the US spy drama Homeland opposite Claire Danes, as ex-British special forces bodyguard Mike Brown. From 2016 to 2018 he starred in Jamestown as Henry Sharrow, depicting the first British settlers to colonise Virginia in 1609.  He joined the cast of The Outsider on HBO in June 2019, which aired from January 2020.

Beesley has been the narrator for several TV advertisements, including ITV, NFU Mutual's insurance, Energizer's lithium batteries, and PC World. He also provided the voiceover for Manchester United's season review DVD. In 2011, he appeared in a TV campaign for the UK recruitment company Jobsite, and was also featured on their homepage. Beesley narrated the documentary Chatsworth, shown on BBC One in May 2012.

Music
Beesley is also a session musician, and solo artist, having had a successful career before becoming an actor. He was a chorister at Manchester Cathedral and studied at Chetham's School of Music. He also studied percussion and classical piano at the Guildhall School of Music & Drama with soul singer Omar and toured with the Brand New Heavies on keyboards and percussion. He has also toured or recorded with George Benson, Earth Wind and Fire, Stevie Wonder, The JB's and Zero7.  He is also a vibraphone player.

Beesley has performed in concert as a percussionist and pianist for Robbie Williams, Take That, Jamiroquai, and the Paul Weller Movement. He played percussion and piano at Williams' Knebworth gigs in summer 2003 and at Hyde Park for Live 8 London. Williams' first concert of his Close Encounters Tour in Perth on 30 November 2006 saw Beesley as percussionist for the second half of the show. He also played drums during the performance of "Rudebox" at Williams' second Brisbane concert and during a BBC Electric Proms show.

Beesley was a member of the jazz band Incognito, but in 1994, after an eight-month tour with them, decided to end his music career and start acting. On 28 October 2006, Beesley appeared as a special guest pianist for James Brown during his performance at the Roundhouse in London as part of the BBC's Electric Proms festival. In 2020, he recorded his first solo album titled Groove Spectrum at Capitol Studios in Los Angeles with Grammy-winning producer/mixer Al Schmitt mixing the album. It features Paul Weller, Robbie Williams, Fred Durst, Lisa Stansfield, jazz pianist Christian Sands, Tommy Blaize, Antonique Smith, John Turrell, Omar, and Francci Richards. A multi-instrumentalist, Beesley wrote, played, and scored the album.

Filmography

References

External links
 Maxton Beesley's website
 

1971 births
Alumni of the Guildhall School of Music and Drama
English rock drummers
English rock pianists
English jazz musicians
English male film actors
English male television actors
Living people
People from Burnage
People educated at Chetham's School of Music
20th-century English male actors
21st-century English male actors
Male actors from Manchester
People educated at Parrs Wood High School
Robbie Williams Band members
21st-century British pianists
21st-century drummers
Incognito (band) members